FPCC may refer to:

Fair Play for Cuba Committee
First Peoples' Cultural Council